Durham City Council elections were generally held every four years between the reforms of 1974 and the council's abolition in 2009. Durham was a non-metropolitan district in County Durham, England. On 1 April 2009 the council's functions passed to Durham County Council, which became a unitary authority.

Political control
From 1836 to 1974 the city of Durham was a municipal borough, sometimes called "Durham and Framwelgate". Under the Local Government Act 1972 it had its territory enlarged and became a non-metropolitan district. The first election to the reconstituted city council was held in 1973, initially operating as a shadow authority before coming into its revised powers on 1 April 1974. Political control of the council from 1973 until its abolition in 2009 was held by the following parties:

Leadership
The leaders of the council from 2003 until its abolition in 2009 were:

Council elections

By-election results
The following is an incomplete list of by-elections to Durham City Council.

Notes

References

Council elections in County Durham
Politics of Durham, England
District council elections in England